Fight for Life is a 1987 American made-for-television drama film starring Jerry Lewis (in his television film debut), Patty Duke and Morgan Freeman. It was originally broadcast on March 23, 1987, on ABC.

Plot
Dr. Bernard Abrams, an Ohio optometrist, and his wife Shirley Abrams have a six-year-old daughter that suffers from a rare form of epilepsy.  The child's paraplegic doctor cares for her. As for the little girl's parents, they need to have a drug approved from the Food and Drug Administration. However, the process is slow and they are forced to fly to England to obtain the medication.  They take their cause to the media in order to highlight their case and force the FDA to expedite its decision on use in America.

Cast 
 Jerry Lewis : Dr. Bernard Abrams
 Patty Duke : Shirley Abrams
 Barry Morse : Dr. Whalley
  Morgan Freeman : Dr. Sherard
 Jaclyn Bernstein : Felice Abrams
 Gérard Parkes : Father Robert Hunt
 Robert Benson : Dr. Keith
 Rosemary Dunsmore
 Patricia Hamilton

Home media
The film was released twice on DVD.  The first release was on September 4, 2012, on a Morgan Freeman dual release with Moll Flanders.  It was later released on October 31, 2012, on an Amazon exclusive dual 'Family Film' release with Dominick and Eugene.

It is available to stream on Paramount+.

External links

References

1987 television films
1987 films
1987 drama films
ABC network original films
Films directed by Elliot Silverstein
Films scored by Laurence Rosenthal
American drama television films
1980s American films
1980s English-language films
English-language drama films